Regnbågslandet ("The Rainbow Land") was the Sveriges Television's Christmas calendar and Sveriges Radio's Christmas Calendar in 1970.

Plot 
Each time every day, Nanna walks through a gate in a tree, leading to the "Rainbow Land". Leaving December darkness for to a world of summer and greenery, she teaches the Rainbow Land inhabitants about Christmas.

References

External links 
 

1970 radio programme debuts
1970 radio programme endings
1970 Swedish television series debuts
1970 Swedish television series endings
Sveriges Radio's Christmas Calendar
Sveriges Television's Christmas calendar
Swedish television shows featuring puppetry